Jaroslav Marx (born 20 July 1971 in Czechoslovakia) is a Czech retired footballer.

Malta

Marx played for SK Tatran Poštorná until 2002, when he was signed by Birkirkara F.C., and was able to take part in the UEFA Cup. Although he was almost not offered a new contract that winter, he performed well in a game against Mosta F.C., helping Birkirkara win 2-0, and the board changed their mind about terminating his contract until June 2003.

In 2005, he flew to the Czech Republic so that he could receive injury treatment while on the books of Valletta F.C.

References

External links 
 Fupa Profile 
 Birkirkara FC Profile 
 

Expatriate footballers in Malta
Expatriate footballers in Germany
Balzan F.C. players
Czech expatriate footballers
Association football midfielders
FK Fotbal Třinec players
KFC Uerdingen 05 players
Czech footballers
Maltese Premier League players
Valletta F.C. players
Birkirkara F.C. players
Living people
1971 births
Bonner SC players
1. SC Znojmo players